All Alone is an album by Frank Sinatra, released in 1962.

Originally, All Alone was going to be called Come Waltz with Me. Although the title and the accompanying specially written title song were dropped before the album's release, the record remained a stately collection of waltzes, arranged and conducted by Gordon Jenkins. The original title track is included as a bonus track on the 1992 compact disc release of the album.  This was the first studio album from Sinatra to not make the U.S. Top Twenty since 1950.

All of the tracks on the album are torch songs, hence the lonely name of the album. Five of the tracks were written by Irving Berlin.

The cover is a trimmed portion of a painting that hung in Sinatra's Palm Springs home.

Track listing
Side 1:
"All Alone" (Irving Berlin)  – 2:42
"The Girl Next Door" (Hugh Martin, Ralph Blane)  – 3:18
"Are You Lonesome Tonight?" (Roy Turk, Lou Handman)  – 3:31
"Charmaine", (Erno Rapee, Lew Pollack)  – 3:17
"What'll I Do?" (Berlin)  – 3:15
"When I Lost You" (Berlin)  – 3:43

Side 2:
"Oh, How I Miss You Tonight"  (Benny Davis, Joe Burke, Mark Fisher)  – 3:21
"Indiscreet" (Sammy Cahn, Jimmy Van Heusen)  – 3:52
"Remember" (Berlin)  – 3:23
"Together" (B.G. DeSylva, Lew Brown, Ray Henderson, Stephen Ballantine)  – 3:21
"The Song is Ended (But The Melody Lingers On)" (Berlin)  – 3:25

CD reissue bonu tracks not included on the original 1962 release:
"Come Waltz With Me" (Cahn, Van Heusen)  – 2:53

Personnel
 Frank Sinatra - vocals
 Gordon Jenkins - arranger, conductor

References

Frank Sinatra albums
Reprise Records albums
1962 albums
Albums arranged by Gordon Jenkins
Albums conducted by Gordon Jenkins